Chong In Leong  is a Macanese footballer who plays as a striker for Windsor Arch Ka I.

References 

Living people
1980 births
Macau footballers
Macau international footballers
Association football forwards